Plant perception may refer to:
 Plant perception (physiology), the study of the physiologic mechanisms of plant perception and response to the environment
 Plant perception (paranormal), the study of emotion, polysomnography and paranormal phenomenon as applies to plants